Natalie Jean Williams (born November 30, 1970) is an American basketball executive and former player in the Women's National Basketball Association (WNBA). Williams was inducted into the Women's Basketball Hall of Fame in 2016. She was also an accomplished volleyball player at UCLA. Since 2022, Williams has served as the General Manager of the WNBA's Las Vegas Aces

Early years
Williams is the daughter of Nate Williams, a former basketball player who played for the Cincinnati Royals/Kansas City-Omaha Kings, New Orleans Jazz and the Golden State Warriors in the National Basketball Association during an eight-year career.

Although she was born in Southern California, she went to high school at Taylorsville High School in Utah.

She also has two half brothers and one half sister. Both of her brothers played basketball but her sister chose to focus her athletic abilities on tennis.

College years
She attended the University of California Los Angeles (UCLA), and graduated there in 1994. She was a four-year letter-winner in both basketball and volleyball, and is the first woman to earn All-America honors in both basketball and volleyball in the same year. She also led UCLA to NCAA volleyball titles in 1990 and 1991. She won the Honda-Broderick Award (now the Honda Sports Award) as the nation's best female collegiate volleyball player in both 1992 and 1993.

UCLA statistics
Source

ABL career
Natalie Williams played three seasons for the Portland Power in the American Basketball League (ABL). She was traded to the Long Beach Stingrays in April 1998, but when the team folded, she was reassigned to the Power. She was a two-time All-ABL first team selection, the 1998 ABL M.V.P., finished her first season as the league's top rebounder, averaging 12.5 rebounds per game, and on January 9, 1998, she grabbed a league record 22 rebounds.

WNBA career
After the ABL folded, she was selected by her hometown team, the Utah Starzz in the first round (third pick overall) of the 1999 WNBA Draft on May 4, 1999.

She played with the Starzz from 1999 to 2002. However, just a few weeks prior to the start of the 2003 season, she was traded to the Indiana Fever in a multi-player deal on May 1, 2003.

Prior to the start of the 2005 season, Williams announced that she would retire after the season ended, saying that she will concentrate on raising her adopted twins, as well as serving as an assistant coach for Skyline' high school Girls basketball team in Salt Lake City, Utah, and launching a new career in the real estate business. She is remembered by fans as one of the best rebounding power forward in the early history of the WNBA.

USA Basketball
Williams was invited to be a member of the Jones Cup team representing the US in 1996. She helped the team to a 9–0 record, and the gold medal in the event. Williams averaged 9.1 points per game. She also recorded 7.0 rebounds per game, highest on the team.

Williams was named to the USA national team in 1998. The national team traveled to Berlin, Germany in July and August 1998 for the FIBA World Championships. The USA team won a close opening game against Japan 95–89, then won their next six games easily. In the semifinal game against Brazil, the USA team was behind as much as ten points in the first half, but the USA went on to win 93–79. The gold medal game was a rematch against Russia. In the first game, the USA team dominated almost from the beginning, but in the rematch, the team from Russia took the early lead and led much of the way. With under two minutes remaining, the USA was down by two points but the USA responded, then held on to win the gold medal 71–65. Williams averaged 12.3 points per game, second highest on the team, and averaged 9.6 rebounds per game, highest on the team.

Williams won an Olympic Gold Medal as a member of the U.S. women's basketball team during the 2000 Summer Olympics in Sydney, Australia.

In 2002, Williams was named to the national team which competed in the World Championships in Zhangjiagang, Changzhou and Nanjing, China. The team was coached by Van Chancellor. The USA team won all nine games, including a close title game against Russia, which was a one-point game late in the game. Williams averaged 5.9 points per game.

Outside basketball
In 2002, she opened a restaurant called Natalie's in Salt Lake City, Utah.  She carried the Olympic Torch in the Salt Lake City area  prior to the 2002 Winter Olympics.
She also was named to the United States 2002 World Championship Games team.

She considers Cheryl Miller as her basketball role model.

Career statistics

Regular season

|-
| style="text-align:left;"|1999
| style="text-align:left;"|Utah
| 28 || 26 || 34.1 || .519 || .000 || .754 || 9.2 || 0.9 || 1.4 || 0.8 || 2.4 || 18.0
|-
| style="text-align:left;"|2000
| style="text-align:left;"|Utah
| 29 || 29 || 35.8 || .490 || .600 || .798 || 11.6 || 1.8 || 1.2 || 0.6 || 2.7 || 18.7
|-
| style="text-align:left;"|2001
| style="text-align:left;"|Utah
| 31 || 31 || 34.3 || .490 || .000 || .729 || 9.9 || 1.8 || 1.3 || 0.3 || 2.3 || 14.2
|-
| style="text-align:left;"|2002
| style="text-align:left;"|Utah
| 31 || 31 || 32.5 || .435 || .417 || .742 || 8.2 || 1.2 || 1.2 || 0.5 || 2.3 || 11.3
|-
| style="text-align:left;"|2003
| style="text-align:left;"|Indiana
| 34 || 34 || 31.0 || .485 || .000 || .709 || 7.5 || 1.4 || 1.3 || 0.6 || 2.1 || 13.4
|-
| style="text-align:left;"|2004
| style="text-align:left;"|Indiana
| 34 || 34 || 28.1 || .454 || .000 || .697 || 6.9 || 1.8 || 1.2 || 0.7 || 1.9 || 10.3
|-
| style="text-align:left;"|2005
| style="text-align:left;"|Indiana
| 34 || 34 || 23.6 || .415 || .000 || .672 || 5.5 || 0.9 || 1.0 || 0.4 || 1.7 || 7.4
|-
| style="text-align:left;"|Career
| style="text-align:left;"|7 years, 2 teams
| 221 || 219 || 31.1 || .474 || .286 || .741 || 8.3 || 1.4 || 1.2 || 0.6 || 2.1 || 13.1

Playoffs

|-
| style="text-align:left;"|2001
| style="text-align:left;"|Utah
| 2 || 2 || 28.5 || .500 ||  || .833 || 8.0 || 0.0 || 1.5 || 0.5 || 2.5 || 10.5
|-
| style="text-align:left;"|2002
| style="text-align:left;"|Utah
| 5 || 5 || 37.2 || .532 || .250 || .679 || 9.2 || 1.4 || 1.0 || 1.4 || 1.6 || 14.0
|-
| style="text-align:left;"|2005
| style="text-align:left;"|Indiana
| 4 || 4 || 33.5 || .425 || .000 || .813 || 7.5 || 1.5 || 1.3 || 0.5 || 0.3 || 11.8
|-
| style="text-align:left;"|Career
| style="text-align:left;"|3 years, 2 teams
| 11 || 11 || 34.3 || .485 || .200 || .740 || 8.4 || 1.2 || 1.2 || 0.9 || 1.3 || 12.5

References

External links
 WNBA Player Profile
 September 18, 2005 Salt Lake Tribune article on her impending retirement
 Natalie Williams on Real Champions

1970 births
Living people
African-American basketball players
All-American college women's basketball players
American women's basketball coaches
American women's basketball players
Basketball players at the 2000 Summer Olympics
Basketball players from Long Beach, California
High school basketball coaches in the United States
Indiana Fever players
Medalists at the 2000 Summer Olympics
Olympic gold medalists for the United States in basketball
Parade High School All-Americans (girls' basketball)
Portland Power players
Power forwards (basketball)
Sportspeople from Long Beach, California
UCLA Bruins women's basketball players
UCLA Bruins women's volleyball players
Utah Starzz draft picks
Utah Starzz players
Women's National Basketball Association All-Stars
Women's National Basketball Association general managers
21st-century African-American sportspeople
21st-century African-American women
20th-century African-American sportspeople
20th-century African-American women
United States women's national basketball team players